The Hall of Sangharama Palace is an important building in Han Chinese Buddhist temples. It is the east annex hall of the Mahavira Hall. The term "Sangharama" refers to "gardens of monks". In Buddhism, it originally refers to constructing the base of monks' dormitories and later it refers to the general term of temples, including land and buildings.

Description

Ancient India
In the Hall of Sangharama Palace, King Pasenadi, Prince Jeta and Anathapindika are enshrined. They created the grand Jetavana Vihara for the Buddha to live and preach, which was a significant contribution to the creation and spread of Buddhism. So they were regarded as Sangharama God, namely the guardian of the land.

China
In Chinese Buddhism, general Guan Yu in the Three Kingdoms period (220–280) is often enshrined in the Hall of Sangharama Palace. It is recorded that in the Sui dynasty (581–618), when the founder of the Tiantai school, master Zhiyi was in Yuquan Mountain in Jingzhou, Hubei, he saw many strange monsters. A deity with long beard who claimed to be Guan Yu appeared and talked to him. Zhiyi preached Buddha Dharma to him, which moved him and he finally devoted himself to Buddhism and became the Dharmapalas of Buddha. Including Guan Yu as Dharmapalas of Buddha promoted the spread of Buddhism in China.

References

Further reading

 
 

Chinese Buddhist architecture